Spencer Spit State Park is a public recreation area ran under the Washington State Parks. It overlooks the Strait of Juan de Fuca. The state park features two sand spits that enclose a salt chuck lagoon that provides a migratory stop for waterfowl, including Bonaparte's gulls. Other local fauna include great blue herons and kingfishers.

Camping
The park has 37 spaces for tent camping with fire pits, one dump station and two restrooms. There are no showers or hookups. Most of the park's tent sites are large and private. Seven walk-in beach sites have limited privacy. The park provides two group camps. The large one accommodates up to 50 people and has ten walk-in sites with a large grassy common area. The small group camp accommodates up to 20 people and has three walk-in sites, one of which is an Adirondack (three-sided) shelter with eight bunks. Check-in time is 2:30 p.m. while check-out time is  1 p.m. Park quiet hours are 10 p.m. to 6:30 a.m. Campers cannot leave the park after 10 p.m.

Day Use
The park provides two kitchen shelters without electricity and 15 unsheltered picnic tables. The kitchen shelters include four picnic tables, a barbecue grill and fire pit. Water is available nearby. Picnic tables with fire pits are located on the spit and the beach site has six picnic tables. 
There are also two miles of  Cascadia Marine hiking trails. The park requires a Discover Pass for vehicles. Hours are 8 a.m. to dusk in the summer. The park is closed Oct through March (specific dates vary yearly).

Recreational Amenities
There are twelve mooring buoys on the Cascadia Marine Trail. Other recreational opportunities include swimming, bald eagle viewing, bird watching, hiking, viewpoints, ferry watching, fishing, clamming, diving, and beachcombing.

Location
The park is located 4.6 mile from the ferry landing, with mainly flat roads, easy for biking. It is 3 miles from the Lopez Village.

History
As Native American tribes migrated up and down the coast, they would stop in this location to clam, crab and fish. Native American activity continued in this area until 1946. The park was originally homesteaded in the 1870s by Katherine and Franklin Troxell. In the late 1800s, they sold the land to Ray and Kathryn "Kate" Spencer, who owned property on Lopez Island and Blakley Island (an island just off the shore of Lopez Island). Between 1913 and 1920 they built a small cabin on one of the sand spits. The stone cellar of the old Spencer House can be seen near the spit. A replica of the original log cabin built by the Spencers for guests is out on the tip of the spit. Ray and Kate lived here for 50 years. The family sold it to the state in 1967. The state was interested in this undeveloped parcel of land because of the blue herons that can be found on it.

Plant Life
Alder, Cedar, Douglas Fir, and Maple trees. Apples, wild berries, and cherries Eel grass, ferns, foxglove hemlock, moss or lichens, rose, seaweed,, ,thistle, and yew.

Wildlife
Birds include crows or ravens, ducks, bald eagles, geese, gulls, hawks, herons, hummingbirds, ospreys, owls, woodpeckers, and wrens. 
Fish and sea life includes clams, cod, crabs, perch, salmon, seabirds, seas, shark, shellfish, and the occasional Southern Resident Orcas pod passing by. 
Mammals include chipmunks, deer, rabbits, raccoons, otters, and squirrels.

Harvest Profile
The south side of the spit is primarily sandy-gravel with eelgrass beds and some mud lower in the intertidal zone. The tip of the spit has a larger cobble substrate with a slightly higher density of clams. The best clam habitat occurs in the muddy gravel flats on the north side of the spit. A brackish lagoon drains through these gravel beds. Clam species available at Spencer Spit State Park include: native littleneck clams, varnish clams, butter clams, and cockles. This is also a very good beach for horse clams. The best place to dig for the horse clams is on the south side of the point. Oysters are not expected to be common at this location.

References

External links
Spencer Spit State Park Washington State Parks and Recreation Commission 
Spencer Spit State Park Map Washington State Parks and Recreation Commission

Parks in San Juan County, Washington
State parks of Washington (state)
Protected areas established in 1967